Sir John Fortescue ( 1394 – December 1479) of Ebrington in Gloucestershire, was Chief Justice of the King's Bench and was the author of De Laudibus Legum Angliae (Commendation of the Laws of England), first published posthumously circa 1543, an influential treatise on English law. In the course of Henry VI's reign, Fortescue was appointed one of the governors of Lincoln's Inn three times and served as a Member of Parliament from 1421 to 1437. He became one of the King's Serjeants during the Easter term of 1441, and subsequently served as Chief Justice of the King's Bench from 25 January 1442 to Easter term 1460.

During the Wars of the Roses, Henry VI was deposed in 1461 by Edward of York, who ascended the throne as Edward IV. Henry and his queen, Margaret of Anjou, later fled to Scotland. Fortescue remained loyal to Henry, and as a result was attainted of treason. He is believed to have been given the nominal title of Chancellor of England during Henry's exile. He accompanied Queen Margaret and her court while they remained on the Continent between 1463 and 1471, and wrote De Laudibus Legum Angliae for the instruction of young Prince Edward. After the defeat of the House of Lancaster, he submitted to Edward IV who reversed his attainder in October 1471.

Origins
Fortescue was born in about 1394 at Norris (or Norreys), in the parish of North Huish in Devon. His eldest brother was Henry Fortescue, Chief Justice of the King's Bench in Ireland. The earliest surviving record of the Fortescue family relates to its 12th-century holding of the manor of Whympston, in the parish of Modbury, Devon.

Career
He was educated at Exeter College, Oxford, favoured by many Devonshire gentry families. He was elected as a Member of Parliament for  Tavistock (1421 to 1425), Totnes (1426 and 1432), Plympton Erle (1429) and Wiltshire (1437).

During the reign of Henry VI, Fortescue was thrice appointed one of the governors of Lincoln's Inn. During the Easter term of 1441 he was made one of the King's Serjeants, and on 25 January in the following year Chief Justice of the King's Bench, a position he held till Easter term 1460. As a judge Fortescue was recommended for his wisdom, gravity and uprightness, and he is said to have been favoured by the king.

He held his office during the remainder of the reign of Henry VI, to whom he was loyal; as a result, he was attainted of treason in the first parliament of Edward IV. When Henry subsequently fled to Scotland, he is supposed to have appointed Fortescue, who appears to have accompanied him in his flight, Chancellor of England. Fortescue referred to himself in this manner on the title page of De Laudibus Legum Angliae, but as the King did not possess the Great Seal of England during his exile it has been suggested that the title was "nominal" and "merely illusory".

In 1463 Fortescue accompanied Queen Margaret and her court in their exile on the Continent, and returned with them to England in 1471. During their exile he wrote for the instruction of the young Prince Edward his celebrated work De laudibus legum Angliæ (Commendation of the Laws of England, first published posthumously around 1543), in which he made the first expression of what would later become known as Blackstone's formulation, stating that "one would much rather that twenty guilty persons should escape the punishment of death, than that one innocent person should be condemned, and suffer capitally". On the defeat of the Lancastrian party he made his submission to Edward IV, who reversed his attainder on 13 October 1471.

Marriage and progeny
John Fortescue married Isabella Jamys, daughter and heiress of John Jamys, by whom he had the following progeny:

Sir Martin Fortescue (died 1472) who married Elizabeth Denzil (or Densil/Densel), the daughter and heiress of Richard Denzil of Filleigh, Weare Giffard and Buckland Filleigh and other manors, all in Devon, in 1454. Filleigh later became the principal seat of the senior line of the Fortescue family, where the Palladian mansion Castle Hill was built c. 1730. Sir Martin Fortescue was the ancestor of the Earls Fortescue.
Robert Fortescue, who married Elizabeth Trenchard.
Maud Fortescue, who married Robert Corbet.
Elizabeth Fortescue, who married Edward Whalesbrough.

Death and burial

The exact date of Fortescue's death is not known, but is believed to be shortly before 18 December 1479. He was buried in the Church of St Eadburga, Ebrington in Gloucestershire, in the manor he had purchased, and after which his descendants took the name of their title Viscount Ebrington, today used as the courtesy title of the eldest son and heir of Earl Fortescue. A painted stone effigy of John Fortescue, wearing his scarlet robes of office with collar of ermine, exists within the church, against the north wall of the chancel within the communion rails. Above it was erected in 1677 by Col. Robert Fortescue (1617–1677) (eight times his descendant and the second son of Hugh Fortescue (1593–1663) of Filleigh) a mural monument with a biographical inscription in Latin. A smaller tablet is affixed below stating that the monument was repaired in 1765 by Matthew Fortescue, 2nd Baron Fortescue. A brass plate below states: "Restored by the Rt Honble. Hugh, 3rd Earl Fortescue, AD 1861".

Legacy
John Fortescue's description of England's mixed monarchy as a dominium politicum et regale (a political and regal kingdom) has been profoundly influential in the history of British constitutional thought. During the 20th century, the earlier portrayal of Fortescue as a constitutionalist has come under pressure from legal and constitutional historians. Scholars of literature have taken an interest in Fortescue's contribution to the development of English prose, and in his role as a Lancastrian writer. More recently, Fortescue's constitutional thought has been reassessed and his Lancastrian affiliation has been challenged.

To this day the John Fortescue Society is joined by students of law at Exeter College, Oxford.

Works

Fortescue's most significant works were composed in Scotland and France, where the Lancastrian party had taken refuge, between 1463 and 1471. Taken together, Opusculum de natura legis naturæ et de ejus censura in successione regnorum suprema (A Small Work on the Nature of the Law of Nature, and on its Judgment on the Succession to Supreme Office in Kingdoms, c. 1463), De laudibus legum Angliæ (1468–1471), and a work written in English around 1471 which was later published as The Difference between an Absolute and Limited Monarchy (1714) and as The Governance of England (1885), provide the first discussion of the political and conceptual underpinnings of the common law, besides commenting on England’s constitutional framework. His works, in particular the masterly vindication of the laws of England De laudibus legum Angliæ, circulated in manuscript in late medieval England and were cited by the leading thinkers of the early Tudor period, among them the printer and playwright John Rastell and the lawyer Christopher St. Germain. De laudibus legum Angliae did not appear in print until about 1543 in the reign of Henry VIII as Prenobilis militis, cognomento Forescu [sic], qui temporibus Henrici sexti floruit, de politica administratione, et legibus ciuilibus florentissimi regni Anglie, commentarius (Commentary on Political Administration and on the Civil Laws of the Most Flourishing Kingdom of England, of the Very Noble Knight, surnamed Forescu [sic], who Flourished during the Reign of Henry VI). It was subsequently reprinted many times under different titles.

The Difference between an Absolute and Limited Monarchy, based on Fortescue's c. 1471 manuscript, was published in 1714 by a descendant, John Fortescue Aland. In the Cotton library there is a manuscript of this work, and its title indicates that it was addressed to Henry VI. However, many passages show plainly that it was written in favour of Edward IV. A revised edition of this work, with a historical and biographical introduction, was published in 1885 by Charles Plummer under the title The Governance of England.

Fortescue also wrote a number of mostly topical works that addressed the political conflict during the Wars of the Roses. Among the surviving works are the pamphlets De titulo Edwardi comitis Marchiæ (The Title of Edward, Earl of March), Of the Title of the House of York, Defensio juris domus Lancastriæ (Defence of the Rights of the House of Lancaster), Replication ageinste the Clayme, and Title of the Duke of Yorke for the Crownes of England and France, as well as the treatise Opusculum de natura legis naturæ et de ejus censura in successione regnorum suprema already mentioned. Two further works, Declaration upon Certayn Wrytinges Sent oute of Scotteland and Articles Sent to Warwick have been discussed by recent scholarship. All of Fortescue's minor writings appear in The Works of Sir John Fortescue, published in 1869 for private circulation by another descendant, Thomas Fortescue, 1st Baron Clermont.

A list of Fortescue's printed works and selected later editions follows:

. Later editions:
. (According to the English Short Title Catalogue (ESTC), further editions were issued under this title in 1573 and 1599.)
. (According to the ESTC, further editions were issued under this title in 1660, 1672, 1737, 1741 and 1775.)

.
.
. (According to the ESTC, further editions were issued under this title in 1719 and 1724).
Later editions:
. Digital versions of text are available online, including at The University of Michigan's Corpus of Middle English and Prose and Verse.
. [Photo reprints of the original Clermont text are now available, including an edition from The British Library, Historical Print Editions (2011): ]
Modern editions of Fortescue's major works:
Fortescue, Sir John. (1942),  De Laudibus Legum Angliae, Edited and translated by S. B. Chrimes, (2nd Edition: 2011). Cambridge, Cambridge University Press, c[includes an extensive introduction along with Latin and  English texts]
Fortescue, Sir John. (1997),  On the Laws and Governance of England. Edited by Shelly Lockwood. Cambridge: Cambridge University Press, .  [includes a new English translation of De Laudibus Legum   Angliae, The Governance of England in modern English, and selected passages from the  Opusculum de natura legis naturæ and lesser works]

Notes

References
.
.
.

Further reading

Callahan, Edwin T.  (1995), "The Apotheosis of Power: Fortescue on the Nature of Kingship". Majestas vol. 3, p. 35-68.
Cromartie, Alan.  (2004), "Common Law, Counsel and Consent in Fortescue's Political Theory", The Fifteenth Century 4: Political culture in late Medieval Britain p. 45-68.
Doe, Norman. (1990). Fundamental Authority in Late Medieval English Law. Cambridge: Cambridge University Press, .
.
 – discusses Fortescue's role in the succession crisis between the Houses of Lancaster and York.
Gross, Anthony J. (1996), The dissolution of the Lancastrian kingship: Sir John Fortescue and the crisis of monarchy in fifteenth century England.  London: Stamford, . [foreword by J. R. Lander].
Jacob, Ernest Frazer.  (1953), "Sir John Fortescue and the Law of Nature", Jaccob, Essays in the Conciliar Epoch. Manchester University Press, p. 106-120, 247-248.
Kekewich, Margaret Lucille.  (1998), "Thou shalt be under the power of man". Sir John Fortescue and the Yorkist Succession", Nottingham Medieval Studies vol. 42 (1998) p. 188-230.
Kelly, M. R. L. L. (2014), "Sir John Fortescue and the Political Dominium: The People, the Common Weal, and the King",  Galligan, Denis Ed., Constitutions and the Classics: Patterns of Constitutional Thought from Fortescue to Bentham, Oxford: Oxford University Press.   
Litzen, Veikko.  (1971).  "A war of roses and lilies. The theme of succession in Sir John Fortescue's works", Annales Academiae Scientiarum Fennicae B vol. 173 (1971) p. 5-73.   
McGerr,  Rosemarie, (2011), A Lancastrian Mirror for Princes: The Yale Law School New Statutes of England. Bloomington, IN: Indiana University Press, .   
Mosse, George L.  (1952),  "Sir John Fortescue and the Problem of Papal Power",  Medievalia et humanistica vol. 7 (1952) p. 89ff. 
.
Taylor, Craig David.  (1999), "Sir John Fortescue and the French Polemical Treatises of the Hundred Years War", The English Historical Review vol. 114 (1999) p. 112-129.
John L Watts, (1999) Henry VI and the Politics of Kingship. Cambridge: Cambridge University Press, .

 

1394 births
1479 deaths
15th-century English writers
English Roman Catholics
Alumni of Exeter College, Oxford
Serjeants-at-law (England)
English legal writers
John
English MPs December 1421
Knights Bachelor
Lawyers from Devon
Lord chief justices of England and Wales
Burials in Gloucestershire
English male non-fiction writers
15th-century English lawyers
English MPs 1423
English MPs 1425
English MPs 1426
English MPs 1429
English MPs 1432
English MPs 1437
Members of the Parliament of England for Tavistock